In mathematics, the Bauer–Fike theorem is a standard result in the perturbation theory of the eigenvalue of a complex-valued diagonalizable matrix. In its substance, it states an absolute upper bound for the deviation of one perturbed matrix eigenvalue from a properly chosen eigenvalue of the exact matrix. Informally speaking, what it says is that the sensitivity of the eigenvalues is estimated by the condition number of the matrix of eigenvectors.

The theorem was proved by Friedrich L. Bauer and C. T. Fike in 1960.

The setup
In what follows we assume that:
  is a diagonalizable matrix;
  is the non-singular eigenvector matrix such that , where  is a diagonal matrix. 

The Bauer–Fike Theorem
Bauer–Fike Theorem. Then there exists  such that:

Proof. We can suppose , otherwise take  and the result is trivially true since .

However our assumption, implies that:  and therefore we can write:

This reveals  to be an eigenvalue of 

In this instance this gives us:

But  is a diagonal matrix, the -norm of which is easily computed:

whence:

An Alternate Formulation
The theorem can also be reformulated to better suit numerical methods. In fact, dealing with real eigensystem problems, one often has an exact matrix , but knows only an approximate eigenvalue-eigenvector couple,  and needs to bound the error. The following version comes in help.

Bauer–Fike Theorem (Alternate Formulation). Then there exists  such that:

Proof. We can suppose , otherwise take  and the result is trivially true since . So  exists, so we can write:

since  is diagonalizable; taking the -norm of both sides, we obtain:

However 

 

is a diagonal matrix and its -norm is easily computed:

whence:

A Relative Bound
Both formulations of Bauer–Fike theorem yield an absolute bound. The following corollary is useful whenever a relative bound is needed:

Corollary. Then there exists  such that:

Proof.

If we set:

then we have:

The Case of Normal Matrices 
If  is normal,  is a unitary matrix, therefore:

so that . The Bauer–Fike theorem then becomes:

Or in alternate formulation:

which obviously remains true if  is a Hermitian matrix. In this case, however, a much stronger result holds, known as the Weyl's theorem on eigenvalues.

References 
 
 

Spectral theory
Theorems in analysis
Articles containing proofs